Florence Baverel (born 24 May 1974 in Pontarlier, Doubs), is a retired French biathlete who competed in the biathlon at the 2006 Winter Olympics in Turin, Italy. Baverel-Robert won the gold medal in the women's 7.5 km sprint. She placed 26th in the women's 15 km individual event, 5th in the 12.5 km mass start and 13th in the 10 km pursuit final.

She married fellow French biathlete Julien Robert.  They have one daughter Rose. Now they are divorced.

At the end of the 2006-07 World Cup season, which she finished in 5th place in the overall standings (her best career result), she announced the end of her career.

Achievements 

 Biathlon World Cup
 1 × 5th place in overall (2006/07)
 2 × 7th place in overall (1994/95, 1995/96)
 1 victory in the trials for the World Cup

References 

 IBU Profile

1974 births
Living people
People from Pontarlier
French female biathletes
Biathletes at the 2006 Winter Olympics
Olympic gold medalists for France
Olympic bronze medalists for France
Olympic biathletes of France
Olympic medalists in biathlon
Biathlon World Championships medalists
Medalists at the 2006 Winter Olympics
Sportspeople from Doubs
20th-century French women
21st-century French women